Soy tu fan (English: I'm your fan) is a Mexican romantic comedy television series produced by Canana Films, Fox Television Studios and Once TV México, and is an adaptation of the Argentina series of the same name created by Dolores Fonzi and Constanza Novick. It is directed by Álvaro Hernández, Mariana Chenillo & Gerardo Naranjo, produced by Pablo Cruz, Constanza Novick, Gael García Bernal, Diego Luna, Geminiano Pineda, Jorge Mondragón, Diego Martínez Ulanosky and Ana Claudia Talancón and written by Constanza Novick. It premiered Wednesday, April 28, 2010 in Mexico on Once TV Mexico, and in the United States on mun2, October 17, 2010.  Season 2 began airing on October 19, 2011 on Once TV in Mexico.

Synopsis 
Charly (Ana Claudia Talancón) and Nicolas meet in a coffee shop in Mexico City after Charly's breakup with Julián, the frontman of an upcoming band. Nicolas shows interest in Charly and tells her to tell her therapist, with whom she has an appointment later, that she just met the love of her life. Charly appreciates the attention but she feels harassed by him, until after Nicolas's endless attempts to get her to go out with him, he gives up and starts dating a struggling actress. The lack of attention brings Charly back and they engage in a relationship. Rocío and Fernanda, Charly's best friends witness her in her fight to make it work with Nicolas while still trying to get over Julián and put up with his obnoxious new girlfriend, Vanesa.

Cast and characters 
Ana Claudia Talancón as Carla "Charly" García
Martín Altomaro as Nicolás "Nico" Cruz
Osvaldo Benavides as Julián Muñoz
Edwarda Gurrola as Vanesa
Maya Zapata as Rocío Lozano
Joahanna Murillo as Fernanda De la Peza
Verónica Langer as Marta Molina
Juan Pablo Medina as Iñaki Díaz de Olavarrieta
Gonzalo García Vivanco as Diego García
Marcela Guirado as Ana
Juan Pablo Campa as Federico
Alfonso Borbolla as Javier
Fernando Carrillo Serrano as Facu González
Iván Arana as Emilio Cruz
Camila Selser as Nini
Tara Parra as Beba
Francisco Rubio as Rodrigo
Mar Carrera as Claudia
Mariana Gajá as Caro
Fernando Carrillo as Willy
Leonardo de Lozanne as Tutor de Charly
Randy Ebright as Kevin
 as Roly
Jorge Mondragón as Director de teatro
Alejandra Ambrosi as Fer
Salvador Zerboni as Junior
Alejandra Ambrosi as Marce
Rubén Zamora as Español

Songs heard in the series

Fan - Sandoval
Jugando con el corazón- Corazón
Nadie se dará cuenta - Linda Guilala
Todo o nada- Los Wendy's
Y tú de que vas - Franco de Vita
Espero que te acuerdes de mi- Agrupacion Cariño
Waffes- Los Wendy's
Revolución de vegetales - Modular
Esta soledad- Carla Morrison
Unidos- Cola jet set
Curse the space - Hey chica
I'm queen - Le butcherettes
Obra de arte- Agrupacion cariño
Aunque yo te quise tanto - Agrupacion cariño chicha
Algo raro- Sigle
Tarde o temprano - Elis Paprika
El amor mejora- Cola jet set
Issues- Hey chica
Y al final - Bianca Alexander
Fiesta permanente- Pau y sus amigos
La peligrosa - Los wendy's
Estando contigo - Los soberanos
Dame la felicidad - Bianca Alexander
Fuego al juego- Pau y amigos
La revolucio sexual - La casa azul
Nunca voy a olvidarte- Mariana Gaja
Lágrimas- Carla Morrison
Vamos a volar- La casa azul
Ovni - Modular
El río se llevará tu nombre- Corazón
Bendita - La bien querida
Por ti no moriré -Joe Arroyo y la verdad
Que suene mi campana- La sonora carruseles & harold
Se me perdió la cadenita- Sonora dinamita
Me tienes vigilado- Orquesta los Niches
Sobre dosis- Los titanes & Oscar Quesada
María Shaula - Jorge Luke
Hoy ten miedo de mi- Fernando Delgadillo
Hippie - Modular
Lo que me gusta del verano es poder tomar helado- Papa topo
Creo que me quieres- Los fresones rebeldes
Right for you - Asia
Matrimonio por conveniencia - Pau y sonido trucha
Aunque yo te quise tanto - Agrupacion cariño
Rewind- Gentleman reg
Nadie se dará cuenta - Linda Guilala
Cucurrucho- Guatafan
El moneto más feliz- La casa azul
Issues - Hey chica
Acapulco- Agrupacion cariño
Estando contigo- Los Soberanos
Corre - Bianca Alexander
Algo raro- Single
El tripulante - Agrupacion Cariño
Nadie se dará cuenta - Linda Guilala
Llevame a dormir- Single
Cielo rojo- Fernando Carrillo
Obra de arte - Agrupacion Cariño
Que suene mi campana- Sonora carruseles
Compartir- Carla Morrison
El sueño de mi vida- Cola jet set

References

External links 
 
 
Soy tu fan at mun2 (in English)
Soy tu fan at Once TV

2010 Mexican television series debuts
Television shows set in Mexico
Television series by 20th Century Fox Television
2010s Mexican television series
Romantic comedy television series
Mexican comedy television series
Mexican television series based on Argentine television series